The Royd Moor Wind Farm is located at Penistone, Barnsley, South Yorkshire, England, and consists of thirteen 450 kW turbines.

The maximum output is 6 mW, equivalent to the annual energy required to power 3,300 homes.

The original planning application was for a 25-year operation but this has been extended to 30 years. Currently, the farm is due to be decommissioned in 2023.

References

External links

Renewables: Building a Sustainable future for generations to come

Buildings and structures in the Metropolitan Borough of Barnsley
Wind farms in England
Penistone
Power stations in Yorkshire and the Humber